Tyler Pace (born April 5, 1995) is a Canadian professional indoor lacrosse forward playing with the Calgary Roughnecks of the National Lacrosse League (NLL).

After attending Blue Ridge High School in Coquitlam, British Columbia, Pace attended the University of Denver and played for the Denver Pioneers men's lacrosse team. In 2016 he was named to USILA Second Team All-America and BIG EAST First Team. Then in 2017 to BIG EAST Second Team.

Pace was selected 9th overall in the 2017 NLL Entry Draft.

References 

1995 births
Living people
Calgary Roughnecks players
Canadian lacrosse players
Denver Pioneers men's lacrosse players
Lacrosse forwards
People from Coquitlam
Sportspeople from British Columbia